Turrancilla williamsoni is a species of sea snail, a marine gastropod mollusk in the family Ancillariidae.

Description
Original description: "Shell very slender and elongated, shiny and polished, with an elongated, protracted spire; fascicular band very small, restricted to anterior tip of shell; suture distinctly keeled; shell pale yellow-orange with darker orange enamel along shoulder and on spire whorls; fasciole darker orange; protoconch large, rounded, dome-like; interior of aperture pale orange; columella with 1 large twisted plication; operculum unknown."

Distribution
Locus typicus: "Off Punto Fijo, Gulf of Venezuela, Venezuela."

References

Ancillariidae
Gastropods described in 1987